The Molat concentration camp (Croatian: Koncentracijski logor Molat; Hebrew: מחנה מולת) was an Italian concentration camp, established during World War II, by Fascist Italy on the island of Molat and was subordinate to the  Italian Ministry of the Interior.

The camp existed from June 30, 1942 to September 8, 1943 and, like the Gonars and Rab concentration camps, was used mainly for the internment of Slovenes, Croats and Jews in order to "Italianize" the region of annexed Dalmatia. According to the camp's commemorative plaque, the camp, consisting of five barracks, was passed through by about 20,000 inmates, of whom about 1,000 died, due to the inhumane conditions in the camp or were shot as hostages in retaliation for Partisan attacks.

External links 
 Campo di Concentramento Molat by I Campi Fascisti
 Italian concentration camp in Jaza bay on the island Molat Jasenovac Memorial Site

References

Italian concentration camps